Si Me Recuerdas (Eng.: "If You Remember Me") is the eleventh studio album released by Los Bukis in 1988, and was nominated for a Grammy Award for Best Mexican-American Album.

Track listing

All songs written and composed by Marco Antonio Solís

Chart performance

References

1988 albums
Los Bukis albums
Fonovisa Records albums
Albums produced by Marco Antonio Solís